Kigen Luka Kipkorir is a Kenyan politician. He belongs to the Orange Democratic Movement and was elected to represent the Rongai Constituency in the National Assembly of Kenya since the 2007 Kenyan parliamentary election.

References

Living people
Year of birth missing (living people)
Orange Democratic Movement politicians
Members of the National Assembly (Kenya)